Tap tap is a type of taxicab.

Tap Tap may also refer to:

Tap Tap (series), a series of video games for the iPhone
Tap Tap Revenge, the first game in the series
Tap Tap (band), a British indie band

See also
Tap (disambiguation)